Justin Steven Welch (born 4 December 1972) is an English musician, best known as the drummer in Elastica, Suede, and later the drummer in Lush.

Biography
Welch moved to London in his late teens and studied at London's Drumtech drum school. He played drums in a number of bands in the early 1990s, including an early line-up of Suede (where he would first meet Justine Frischmann) and Spitfire.

In 1996 Welch also formed the Britpop supergroup Me Me Me with Blur bassist Alex James and The Lilac Time frontman Stephen Duffy, who released one single "Hanging Around".

Elastica split in 2001 and Welch moved to Devon where he taught drums in secondary and primary schools.

In 2012, he was in a duo with friend and former EMF frontman James Atkin called 'Asbo Kid'. He also played drums for local Brighton bands Das Fenster and Oscillator.

In 2013, Welch briefly re-united with Suede for several gigs to replace drummer Simon Gilbert who was unable to play due to contracting tuberculosis.

It was announced, in September 2015, that Welch would play drums in the newly reformed Lush.

On 21 January 2017 three-quarters of the original line-up of Elastica – Matthews, Annie Holland and Justin Welch – worked together on the remastering of Elastica.

In December 2017, the Elastica Facebook page announced that Welch featured on the debut single of a new British rock band called The Rockerati, "16 Tons". A post on Welch's personal Facebook page noted that the release had been receiving substantial radio airplay in the US.

Welch worked on a project called Piroshka with their debut album, Brickbat, released on 15 February 2019.

On May 1, 2021, Rakka Rakka Records released Dethhaus, an instrumental project Welch participated in with Johnny Void (guitarist, bassist, and keyboardist).

Welch is currently working on a new project called The Stalwart Lovers with Sean Curran from The Sickerthings and Ricky Maymi from The Brian Jonestown Massacre their debut album, Love Songs For A Broken Heart, Release date is anticipated to be sometime in late 2022.

In 2022, Welch joined The Jesus and Mary Chain as their new drummer.

Personal life
He lives in Hastings and is married to keyboardist Mew (known for playing in Elastica on the band's second album, and Heave), who is currently working as an artist.

Discography

Albums
 Elastica (1995, by Elastica)
 The Menace (2000, by Elastica)
 Brickbat  (2019, by Piroshka)
 Love Drips and Gathers (2021, by Piroshka)

Singles and EPs
 2 Tone Techno (2012, by The Asbo Kid)
 Blind Spot (2016, by Lush)
 "16 Tons"  (2017, by The Rockerati)
 DETHHAUS (2021, by DETHHAUS)
 DETHHAUS 2 (2023, by DETHHAUS)

References

https://oost-online.nl/mary-chains-justin-welch-it-was-written-in-the-stars/

1972 births
Living people
People from Nuneaton
English rock drummers
English songwriters
Elastica members
Suede (band) members
Britpop musicians
21st-century drummers
Me Me Me (band) members
Lush (band) members